is a Japanese professional footballer who plays as a forward for V-Varen Nagasaki.

Club career
Tamada joined Kashiwa Reysol from Narashino High School in 1999. His debut was the game against Avispa Fukuoka on 13 March 1999. Kashiwa Reysol won the J.League Cup tile that year. He was not a key player from the start. His prominence grew gradually, especially in the latter half of the 2002 season. He was selected to the Japan national team in 2004. He transferred to Nagoya Grampus Eight (later Nagoya Grampus) taking the opportunity of Kashiwa Reysol's relegation to J2 in 2006. He took an active part in the 2008 season and Nagoya participated in the AFC Champions League for the first time. He enumerated two goals in 2009 AFC Champions League for Nagoya Grampus and contributed to the team's semifinal advancement. Nagoya Grampus won the J1 League Championship in 2010. He played for Cerezo Osaka in the 2015 season.

On 29 December 2016, Tamada re-joined Nagoya Grampus. He signed another one-year contract with the club on 20 December 2017. On 6 December 2018, Tamada was released by Nagoya Grampus.

In 2019, Tamada moved to J2 League club V-Varen Nagasaki.

International career
Tamada made his field debut as a member of the Japan national team against Singapore in 2006 FIFA World Cup qualification on 31 March 2004.
He scored three goals in the 2004 AFC Asian Cup, and this contributed to the Japan national team's top place finish. He was a member of the Japan team at the 2006 FIFA World Cup. He scored a goal against Brazil in the first round of that World Cup. He scored two goals in 2010 FIFA World Cup qualification matches helping Japan reach the 2010 FIFA World Cup. He participated in two games at the 2010 World Cup. He played 72 games and scored 16 goals for Japan until 2010.

Career statistics

Club

International 

Scores and results list Japan's goal tally first, score column indicates score after each Tamada goal.

Honors
Kashiwa Reysol
 J.League Cup: 1999

Nagoya Grampus
 J1 League: 2010
 Japanese Super Cup: 2011

Japan
 AFC Asian Cup: 2004

Individual
 East Asian Football Championship  top scorer: 2010

References

External links
 
 
 Japan National Football Team Database
 
 Keiji Tamada's official blog 
 Profile at V-Varen Nagasaki 

1980 births
Living people
Association football people from Chiba Prefecture
Japanese footballers
Japan international footballers
J1 League players
J2 League players
Kashiwa Reysol players
Nagoya Grampus players
Cerezo Osaka players
V-Varen Nagasaki players
2004 AFC Asian Cup players
2005 FIFA Confederations Cup players
2006 FIFA World Cup players
2010 FIFA World Cup players
AFC Asian Cup-winning players
Association football forwards